The Great Amber Concert Hall is a concert hall, cultural and arts centre in Liepāja, Latvia. The building features a cone-shaped structure, enveloped by a tilted glazed facade.

The Liepāja Symphony Orchestra is a resident of the concert hall.

References

Buildings and structures in Liepāja
Concert halls in Latvia